The Australian bonito,  horse mackerel or little bonito, Sarda australis is a fish of the family Scombridae and is found in eastern Australia and New Zealand. They swim at depths reaching depths of approximately 30 m (98 ft), in open water. Its length is commonly at around  fork length and  weight.

References

 
 Tony Ayling & Geoffrey Cox, Collins Guide to the Sea Fishes of New Zealand,  (William Collins Publishers Ltd, Auckland, New Zealand 1982) 
 

Scombridae
Fish described in 1881